Uddeholm is a locality situated in Hagfors Municipality, Värmland County, Sweden with 667 inhabitants in 2010.

The company Uddeholms AB, located in Hagfors is named after the locality.

References 

Populated places in Värmland County
Populated places in Hagfors Municipality